Cycas xipholepis is a species of cycad. It is native to Queensland, where it is confined to the Cape York Peninsula.

References

xipholepis
Endemic flora of Queensland